The Marker Wadden is an artificial archipelago under development in the Markermeer, a lake in the Netherlands. The first island was inaugurated on 24 September 2016. It is a nature reserve alternative to the much bigger proposed Markerwaard polder that was begun in 1941 but paused and finally abandoned in 2003.

Project 
The project was proposed in 2012 by the Vereniging Natuurmonumenten. The Dutch government, BirdLife Netherlands, ANWB, and VNO-NCW are partners in its development.

Work on the first phase, which is mainly focused on the construction of the first island, started in April 2016, with Boskalis Westminster being awarded the contract.

The main aims of the project are to create breeding grounds, islands, and coast line as well as to improve the water ecology of the Markermeer. The project creates a wetland comparable with the Wadden Sea—hence the name of the project—yet without tides. This is because the Markermeer is not connected to the sea and is in a fresh water environment.  
The new nature reserve is accessible to tourists. There is a ferry service from the city of Lelystad, itself a city built on reclaimed IJsselmeer land.

On 11 May 2016, the first new island was completed, Natuurmonumenten called this a "milestone". In March 2017, it was announced that four other islands should be completed before 2020.

Flora and Fauna
The islands have been colonized by large numbers of breeding birds. A colony of 200 breeding pairs of pied avocet has made the islands their home, as has a large colony of common tern. Little terns also breed on the islands. Northern shoveler, gadwall, garganey, Mediterranean gull, spoonbill, long-tailed duck and numerous other species of birds have been seen on and around the islands.

Participants
Contributions: Dutch government .

Controversy 
The ecologist  claimed he first had the idea in 1996 and talks about "plagiarism".

References

External links 
 Marker Wadden, Natuurmonumenten

Artificial islands of the Netherlands
Lakes of the Netherlands
Protected areas of the Netherlands
Landforms of Flevoland
Lelystad